Andrew II may refer to:

 Andrew II of Naples, duke of Naples from 834 to 840
 Andrew II, Baron of Vitré ( 1150–1210/11)
 Andrew II of Hungary ( 1177–1235)
 Andrew II, Archbishop of Antivari (died in 1462)

See also
Andrei II of Vladimir, ( 1222–1264), third son of Yaroslav II